Hakeem Yaseen is an Indian politician from Jammu and Kashmir. He is a former revenue, irrigation, transport,and food Minister and a former member of Jammu and Kashmir Legislative Assembly from Khan Sahib Assembly constituency. He is the chairman of  Jammu and Kashmir People's Democratic Front.He has also developed many school ,colleges and hospitals in his area, he Also discover a most popular tourist place  doodhpathri Jammu and Kashmir, and he also developed roads and town etc.[3]

References 

Living people
Year of birth missing (living people)
Jammu and Kashmir politicians